Kirkcudbright Hospital is a health facility in Barrhill Road, Kirkcudbright, Dumfries and Galloway, Scotland. It is managed by NHS Dumfries and Galloway.

History 
The facility was created by the conversion of Townend School, which occupied a mid-19th century building, to the designs of Mr Wallace, a local architect, in 1897. An operating theatre was added in 1921. The hospital joined the National Health Service in 1948.

References 

Hospitals in Dumfries and Galloway
NHS Scotland hospitals
1897 establishments in Scotland
Hospitals established in 1897
Hospital buildings completed in 1897
Kirkcudbright